Carposina atlanticella is a moth in the Carposinidae family. It is found on Madeira.

The wingspan is about 15 mm. The ground colour of the forewings is whitish grey with rust-brown markings. The hindwings are whitish grey.

References

Carposinidae
Moths described in 1894